YRF Television was a TV production company, based in Mumbai, India, and promoted by Aditya Chopra. YRF Television has produced a small number of programmes. 

 It was owned by Yash Raj Films (YRF) It entered into an exclusive agreement with Sony Entertainment Television (now Multi Screen Media Private Limited), one of India's leading television broadcaster, on 6 October 2009 to produce exclusive fiction and non-fiction content for the channel.

Productions

YRF television produced five programmes in its first season, starting on 1 January 2010. It is operating with its second season from 28 January 2011 and has produced a further two programmes to date. Overall, it has produced seven programmes.

References

External links
 Official Website

Film production companies based in Mumbai
Indian companies established in 2009
Television production companies of India
Yash Raj Films
2009 establishments in Maharashtra
Mass media companies established in 2009